Gage Roads is an area in the outer harbour area of Fremantle Harbour in the Indian Ocean offshore from Fremantle, Western Australia.

It incorporates a deep water sea channel as part of its function.

Gage Roads serves as a shipping lane and anchorage for sea traffic heading towards the seaport of Fremantle. Gage Roads was the location of the 1987 America's Cup,

Rottnest Island lies to the west of Gage Roads, Owen Anchorage and Cockburn Sound lie to the south.

The local Gage Roads Brewing Company, as well as the local marine engineering company Gage Roads Marine, are named after the area.

Coastal geology
The area is the most northern of one of four coastal basins formed from the flooding of a depression between Pleistocene aeolianite ridges running north-south, and the subsequent deposition of east-west Holocene banks. The seabed of Gage Roads is covered by seagrass.

Naming
Gage Roads was named after Rear-Admiral Sir William Hall Gage who was the Royal Navy Commander-in-Chief, East Indies, when James Stirling was surveying the Swan River in 1826.

Shipping reports
Gage Roads is identified in shipping reports listing ships at anchor prior to entering the port of Fremantle.

Anchorage
At certain times, over 10 ships can be seen anchored in Gage Roads waiting to enter the port of Fremantle. In addition to these waiting ships, oversized ships that are unable to enter the inner harbour due to size or draft are required to anchor in Gage Roads.

Cruising
In the early 1900s, the local boat SS Zephyr regularly took cruises in Gage Roads.  In the 2000s, the   has used Gage Roads for short sailing cruises.

Wartime
During the World War II era, the Leighton Guns (also known as Leighton Battery) on Buckland Hill were part of the main anti-aircraft defence of the Gage Roads area.

The guns were still operable into the Gage Roads area in the 1950s.

Swimming
Swimmers in the Rottnest Channel Swim (an annual swimming event) start at Cottesloe beach, cross Gage Roads and finish at Rottnest Island.

Notes

 
Indian Ocean
1987 America's Cup
Fremantle Harbour
Roadsteads